Nihon-shiki ("Japan-style," romanized as Nihonsiki in the system itself), is a romanization system for transliterating the Japanese language into the Latin alphabet. Among the major romanization systems for Japanese, it is the most regular one and has an almost one-to-one relation to the kana writing system.

History
It was invented by physicist Aikitsu Tanakadate (田中館 愛橘) in 1885, with the intention to replace the Hepburn system of romanization. Tanakadate's intention was to replace the traditional kanji and kana system of writing Japanese completely by a romanized system, which he felt would make it easier for Japan to compete with Western countries. Since the system was intended for Japanese people to use to write their own language, it is much more regular than Hepburn romanization, and unlike Hepburn's system, it makes no effort to make itself easier to pronounce for English-speakers.

Nihon-shiki was followed by Kunrei-shiki, which was adopted in 1937, after a political debate over whether Nihon-shiki or Hepburn-shiki should be used by the Japanese government. Kunrei is otherwise nearly identical, but it merges syllable pairs di/zi ぢ/じ, du/zu づ/ず, dya/zya ぢゃ/じゃ, dyu/zyu ぢゅ/じゅ, dyo/zyo ぢょ/じょ, wi/i ゐ/い, we/e ゑ/え, kwa/ka くゎ/か, and gwa/ga ぐゎ/が, whose pronunciations in Modern Standard Japanese are now identical. For example, the word かなづかい, rendered kanadukai in Nihon-shiki, is pronounced as kanazukai  in modern Japanese, and is romanized as such in Kunrei. However, some Japanese-speakers still distinguish di from zi and du from zu and so Nihon-shiki spelling is not entirely obsolete.

Nihon-shiki is considered the most regular of the romanization systems for the Japanese language because it maintains a strict "one kana, two letters" form. Because it has unique forms corresponding to each of the respective pairs of kana homophones listed above, it is the only formal system of romanization that can allow (almost) lossless ("round trip") mapping, but the standard does not mandate the precise spellings needed to distinguish ô 王/おう, ou 追う/おう and oo 大/おお. (See the hiragana article for more details.)

Nippon-shiki has been established by the International Organization for Standardization in the ISO 3602 strict form. The JSL system, which is intended for use instructing foreign students of Japanese, is also based on Nihon-shiki.

Romanization charts

Notes
Letters in red are obsolete in modern Japanese.
Even when he へ is used as a particle, it is written as he, not e (Kunrei-shiki/Hepburn).
Even when ha は is used as a particle, it is written as ha, not wa.
Even when wo を is used as a particle, it is written as wo, not o.
Long vowels are indicated by a circumflex accent: long o is written ô, unlike Hepburn, which uses a macron.
Syllabic n ん is written as n before consonants but as n' before vowels and y.
Geminate consonants are always marked by doubling the consonant following the sokuon (っ).

See also 

 List of ISO romanizations

Sources
 Gottlieb, Nanette. "The Rōmaji movement in Japan." Journal of the Royal Asiatic Society (Third Series). January 2010. Vol. 20, iss. 1. pp. 75–88. Published online on November 30, 2009. Available at Cambridge Journals. .
 Kent, Allen, Harold Lancour, and Jay Elwood Daily (Executive Editors). Encyclopedia of Library and Information Science Volume 21. CRC Press, April 1, 1978. , .
Nihongo Daihakubutsukan (日本語大博物館), author: Kida, Jun'ichirō (紀田順一郎 Kida Jun'ichirō), publisher: Just System (ジャストシステム, Jasuto Shisutemu)  (in Japanese), chapter 6.

References

Romanization of Japanese
ISO 3602
Japanese writing system